Dmitry Tursunov was the defending champion, but lost in the first round to Richard Gasquet.

David Nalbandian won in the final 6–3, 6–7(9–11), 6–2, against Jarkko Nieminen.

Seeds
The top four seeds receive a bye to the second round.

Draw

Finals

Top half

Bottom half

Qualifying draw

Seeds

Qualifiers

Lucky loser

First qualifier

Second qualifier

Third qualifier

Fourth qualifier

External links
Main Draw
Qualifying Draw

Medibank International Sydney - Men's Singles
Men